The 1941 Syracuse Orangemen football team was an American football team that represented Syracuse University as an independent during the 1941 college football season. In its fifth season under head coach Ossie Solem, the team compiled a 5–2–1 record and outscored opponents by a total of 190 to 86. The team played its home games at Archbold Stadium in Syracuse, New York.

Guard Dick Weber was selected by the Associated Press as a second-team player on the 1941 All-Eastern football team.

Schedule

References

Syracuse
Syracuse Orange football seasons
Syracuse Orangemen football